Monoszló is a village in Veszprém county, Hungary.

History
The village is a very ancient settlement mentioned in the old charters. One notable descendant of the village is Lodomer, Archbishop of Esztergom in the second half of the 13th century. during king Ladislaus IV of Hungary. As the Archbishop of Esztergom was the second highest rank within the church in Hungary. The village has an old parish church.

Sightseeing
The church of the village exhibits many medieval details in its architecture. The southern doorway is particularly notable and includes the tree of life, flanked by two birds.  Nearby is the Hegyestű geological site, where one can observe the needle shaped basalt rock formation created during the area's volcanic past.

References
 Gerevich T. (1938): Magyarország románkori emlékei. (Die romanische Denkmäler Ungarns.) Egyetemi nyomda. Budapest 
 Dercsényi D. (1972): Románkori építészet Magyarországon. Corvina, Budapest
 Ludwig E. (2002-2008): Rejtőzködő Magyarország. MN Online. A sorozat cikke Monoszló templomáról.
 Szőnyi O. (É.n.): Régi magyar templomok. Alte Ungarische Kirchen. Anciennes églises Hongroises. Hungarian Churches of Yore. A Műemlékek Országos Bizottsága. Mirályi Magyar Egyetemi Nyomda, Budapest.

External links 
 European vine routes portal
 Monoszló in the www.utikonyvem.hu homepage
 Street map (Hungarian)

Populated places in Veszprém County
Romanesque architecture in Hungary
Erdődy family